Harold William McCauley (1913–1977) was an illustrator of pulp magazines in the science fiction field.

Gallery

Footnotes

References

External links
 
 

Science fiction artists
1913 births
1977 deaths